Creme de papaya is a Brazilian dessert. It was a culinary fad in Brazil in the mid-1990s. Nowadays, its popularity has diminished somewhat.

It consists of papaya blended with vanilla ice cream. Crème de cassis is usually added, but a non-alcoholic blackcurrant syrup can be substituted. It is common to blend the papaya and ice cream, then put into serving dish and pour about an ounce of creme de cassis on the top.

See also
 List of Brazilian sweets and desserts

External links
 Creme de Papaya recipe

Brazilian desserts
Frozen desserts
Ice cream